Ballyporeen (Irish: Béal Átha Póirín) is a village in County Tipperary, Ireland. The 2016 census recorded a village population of 318.

Location
It lies in the Galtee-Vee Valley with the Galtee Mountains to the north and the Knockmealdowns to the south. The River Duag which is a tributary of the Suir runs through the village. It is located on the R665 regional road.  The nearest large towns are Mitchelstown and Cahir, which are 12 km and 21 km respectively.

The village is approximately 11 km from Junction 12 of the M8 Motorway.

Transport
During the week, it is served five times a day in each direction by Bus Éireann route 245 linking it to Clonmel, Mitchelstown, Fermoy and Cork. During the weekend, there are three buses each way.

Name
The origins of the name are not definitively understood. The most accepted Irish translation is the "Ford Mouth of the Round Stones". Those stones may have been river deposits or dye stones left there by inhabitants from a cloth dyeing process.
 
Another theory is the original name got corrupted and ambiguated over time; a 1618 document referred to "Bealanporan", this and possible previous forms would alter its meaning. One respected historian believed 'Powers-town' was the correct translation of its origins. An Anglo-Norman family called Power did have connections with the area.

History
The birth period of Ballyporeen as a nucleated settlement is unknown. Up until the 18th Century, Carrigvisteal (approx 1.5 km north of the village) was the main settlement node in the area.
 
Ballyporeen's subsequent growth may put down to a number of factors. In the 1700s the village was on the main coach road between Cork and Dublin, this would have led to passing trade and the opportunity for providing boarding houses and inns for travellers. There was also a mill at lower Main Street, this was known as Kingston's Mills and would have provided employment opportunities. It was operational until at least 1811.

The biggest single factor for the development and expansion of the village, was the involvement of the Earls of Kingston, the main landlord in the area. They owned the market rights on the estate and by 1810 (at the latest), large open air markets were held in the village three times a year. The fact the mill also bore their name indicates they were also probably influential in its creation.

Robert the 2nd Earl is most likely responsible for the village's planned street design, he initiated an ambitious building programme across the estate in the late 1700s. 
Ground rents were kept low in the village to attract shopkeepers and tradespeople. The first edition Ordnance Survey maps (circa 1840) show the basic layout of the village as it is today encompassing the wide straight main street.

Lewis' survey of 1837 notes the village as being located in the barony of Iffa and Offa West and reported that there were 113 houses and 513 inhabitants.

People

Ballyporeen is best known for being the ancestral home of United States President Ronald Reagan. His great-grandfather, Michael Regan (who later changed the spelling of his name), was baptised in the village in 1829 and lived there until his emigration to London not later than 1851 and ultimately the United States in 1857. President Reagan visited the village on 3 June 1984 and delivered a speech to its residents, during which he discussed his ancestry and what he called the "Irish-American tradition".

There was some opposition to Reagan's visit to Ireland, particularly from the Roman Catholic Church. Authorities kept approximately 600 protesters behind barriers on the outskirts of the village on that day, they were not permitted inside until the presidential party had departed. The main focus of the protesters was toward the Reagan administration's foreign policy, in particular its support of the Contras in Nicaragua.

Ballyporeen was previously home to The Ronald Reagan Pub. While the building still stands, the pub closed in 2004 and the following year its fittings and external signage were transferred to the Ronald Reagan Presidential Library in Simi Valley, California.

Ballyporeen is home to the singer/songwriter Gemma Hayes whose hits include Hanging Around from her debut album Night on my Side which was released to critical acclaim and was nominated for the 2002 Mercury Music Prize.

Sport
Soccer, Gaelic football, hurling, racquetball and handball are all represented by clubs in the area.

The local Gaelic football club, Ballyporeen GAA, competes at Senior level within the Southern division of Tipperary GAA. The rural settlement of Skeheenarinky has a hurling club, Skeheenarinky GAA, currently competing at Junior level. Ballyporeen has also had a very successful record in handball.

Parish

The Catholic and Anglican parishes were historically known as Templetenny.

The Catholic Church and clergy based in Ballyporeen service both communities of Ballyporeen and Skeheenarinky which are in the Roman Catholic Diocese of Waterford and Lismore.
The church is called 'The Church of the Assumption' and was opened in 1828.

The local Church of Ireland parish has been amalgamated into the wider Clonmel Union of Parishes. St Matthews; a 50-seater church which stood at the top of Main Street was dismantled c.1911.

There is a ruin of an ancient church at Templetenny approximately 4 km east of the present village of Ballyporeen. The site itself has Christian monastic origins and dates to at least 750 AD when St. Finnchadh was recorded as being abbot.

Cultural references
Ballyporeen is mentioned in the Counting Crows song "Washington Square" off their album Saturday Nights & Sunday Mornings and Christy Moore's song Hey! "Ronnie Reagan" about Reagan's 1984 visit to Ireland.

See also
 List of towns and villages in Ireland

References

External links
Ballyporeenvillage.net - Local information and pictures

Parishes of the Roman Catholic Diocese of Waterford and Lismore
Towns and villages in County Tipperary
Iffa and Offa West